Melba Irene Alspaugh (July 13, 1926 – February 16, 1983) was an American backup outfielder who played from  through  in the All-American Girls Professional Baseball League. She batted and threw right-handed.

Born in Wichita, Kansas, Alspaugh was a light hitting outfielder with good defense and a strong throwing arm. She entered the league in 1948 with the Fort Wayne Daisies, playing for them in part of the season before joining the Rockford Peaches at the end of the year, in time to become a member of the champion team.

In the 1948 playoffs, Rockford swept the Kenosha Comets in the first round of the best-of-five series, and also swept the Racine Belles in the second round of the best-of-five series. The Peaches then went on to win the Championship Title, beating the Daisies in the best-of-seven series, four to one games. Alspaugh hit .240 in eight playoff games (6-for-25), including a double and one stolen base, while driving in one run and scoring four times. She opened 1949 with Rockford, but was traded to the Muskegon Lassies during the midseason.

Alspaugh died in her hometown of Wichita, Kansas, at the age of 56.

Career statistics
Batting

Fielding

Sources

External links

1926 births
1983 deaths
All-American Girls Professional Baseball League players
Baseball outfielders
Baseball players from Wichita, Kansas
Fort Wayne Daisies players
Rockford Peaches players
Muskegon Lassies players
20th-century American women